Diplacanthopoma is a genus of viviparous brotulas.

Species
There are currently nine recognized species in this genus:
 Diplacanthopoma alcockii Goode & T. H. Bean, 1896
 Diplacanthopoma brachysoma Günther, 1887
 Diplacanthopoma brunnea H. M. Smith & Radcliffe, 1913
 Diplacanthopoma japonicus (Steindachner & Döderlein (de), 1887)
 Diplacanthopoma jordani Garman, 1899
 Diplacanthopoma kreffti Cohen & J. G. Nielsen, 2002 (Deepbody cusk)
 Diplacanthopoma nigripinnis Gilchrist & von Bonde, 1924
 Diplacanthopoma raniceps Alcock, 1898
 Diplacanthopoma riversandersoni Alcock, 1895

References

Bythitidae
Taxa named by Albert Günther